SequenceBase is a privately held company, is an international patent sequence information provider with headquarters located in Edison, NJ, USA.
SequenceBase develops and markets the SequenceBase Research Portal to the biotechnology, legal, pharmaceutical, scientific, technical and academic bioinformatics communities.

Clarivate Analytics has acquired SequenceBase on 9th September 2019.

USGENE provides searchable access to all available peptide and nucleotide sequences from the published applications and issued patents of the United States Patent and Trademark Office (USPTO). USGENE can be searched directly via the SequenceBase Research Portal  or via STN International by FIZ Karlsruhe. The SequenceBase Research Portal offers BLAST+ as a sequence searching method.

References

External links 
 STN International: USGENE Workshop Manual 

Biotechnology
Patent search services
Biotechnology companies of the United States